The UPI small college football rankings was a system used by the United Press International (UPI) from 1958 to 1974 to rank the best small college football teams in the United States.

The UPI announced in September 1958 that it had formed a Small-College Football Rating Board consisting of 47 coaches charged on a weekly basis with ranking the nation's best "small college" football teams. The initial board was made up of one coach from each of 47 states. Each coach was asked to submit a weekly ballot ranking the ten best teams out of the 519 small-college football programs. The rankings included schools that were members of the National Collegiate Athletic Association (NCAA), members of the National Association of Intercollegiate Athletics (NAIA), and members of both or neither.  The team ranked No. 1 at the end of the year was presented with a trophy by the UPI.

Top teams in final polls
The following chart lists the top five teams in the final UPI small college rankings for each year from 1958 to 1974. The figures in brackets reflect the number of first-place votes received in the final voting.  The figures in parenthesis reflect the total points received.

References

College football rankings
Small college football rankings